Yves Fortier may refer to:
Yves Fortier (geologist) (1914–2014), former head of the Geological Survey of Canada
Yves Fortier (lawyer) (born 1935), Canadian trial lawyer, arbitrator, corporate director, businessman and diplomat